Braives is a municipality of Wallonia located in the province of Liège, Belgium. 

On January 1, 2006, Braives had a total population of 5,579. The total area is 44.00 km² which gives a population density of 127 inhabitants per km².

The municipality consists of the following districts: Avennes, Braives, Ciplet, Fallais, Fumal, Latinne, Tourinne, and Ville-en-Hesbaye. 

There are also three hamlets: Hosdent in Latinne, Pitet in Fallais, and Foncourt in Fumal.

Fallais is famous for its medieval castle and other tourist attractions including a water mill, a former wheelmakershop, the river Méhaigne and the Ravel cycling path.

Image gallery

See also
 List of protected heritage sites in Braives

References

External links
 

Municipalities of Liège Province